The Mumbai Cricket Association (formerly Bombay Cricket Association) is the governing body for cricket in Mumbai and surrounding regions such as Thane and Navi Mumbai. Its headquarter is situated at Cricket centre in Churchgate, Mumbai. 

It governs Mumbai cricket team and organise, sanctions cricket tournaments in Mumbai district. Its Mumbai team is the most dominant team in India's First-class cricket. It has won Ranji Trophy record 41 times. Cricketers such as Vijay Merchant, Sunil Gavaskar and Sachin Tendulkar etc have played for MCA's team. Its team historically known as batting powerhouse and for "Khadoos" style of play in which the batter sticks to the wickets and plays long innings.

The jurisdiction of MCA includes the area up to Dahanu in the Western Suburbs, Badlapur in the Central Suburbs, and Navi Mumbai up to Kharghar. The Association comes in the west zone.

The Association was established in 1930, as Bombay Cricket Association. Its name was changed after Bombay is renamed as Mumbai.  It is one of three cricket associations that govern cricket in Maharashtra in different regions. The others are Vidarbha Cricket Association controling the Vidarbha region and Maharashtra cricket association that governs cricket in the rest of Maharashtra.

History 

In 1972, under the presidency tenure of S.K. Wankhede, MCA built its own cricket stadium, which was named after S.K. Wankhede as Wankhede Stadium. Now MCA organises its domestic as well as international cricket matches at this stadium. MCA renovated it before 2011 ICC cricket World Cup and organised the final in which India defeated Sri Lanka. It is the home ground of Mumbai cricket team. Since 2007 BCCI's headquarters Cricket centre is situated in the premises of MCA.

See also

Mumbai women's cricket team
Maharashtra Cricket Association
List of Mumbai cricketers 
List of Ranji Trophy records 
Hindu Gymkhana Ground  
Parsi Gymkhana Ground 
Cricket Club of India
Brabourne Stadium

References

External links
Cricinfo profile
Official website
Sportstar article

Cricket in Mumbai
Sports governing bodies in India
Cricket in Maharashtra
Cricket administration in India
1930 establishments in India
Sports organizations established in 1930